Cheseborough was a 19th-century American ship which wrecked off the coast of Japan in 1889.

Cheseborough may also refer to:

Cheseborough, a variation of a C-Clamp (stagecraft)
 Albert S. Cheseborough, designer of the USS Oneida (SP-432)

See also
 Cheeseborough (disambiguation)
 Chesebrough (disambiguation)
 Cheesebrough (disambiguation)
 Chesebro